Kharaji (also Romanized as Kharājī and Kherājī) is a village in Abnama Rural District, in the Central District of Rudan County, Hormozgan Province, Iran. At the 2006 census, its population was 2,648, in 518 families.

References 

Populated places in Rudan County